A columbiad is a type of gun from the 19th century, a large-caliber muzzle-loading cannon capable of firing at low and high angles

Columbiad may also refer to:

Arts and entertainment
 The Columbiad, an epic poem about the founding of the United States of America
 Columbiad, the fictional astronaut-launching space gun created by Jules Verne for From the Earth to the Moon
 Columbiad (ballet), a ballet that debuted in 1939
 "Columbiad" (short story), a 1996 science fiction story by Stephen Baxter, republished in 1997 in Year's Best SF 2 multi-author anthology collection, and in 1998 in Stephen Baxter's anthology collection Traces (book)

Other uses
 Columbiad (spacecraft), the informal name of the Apollo 8 space capsule
 Columbiad (journal), A Quarterly Review of the War Between the States [1997 to 2000 - 13 issues]

See also

 
 Columbia (disambiguation)
 Columbian (disambiguation)
 Columbiana (disambiguation)
 Columbine (disambiguation)
 Columbina (disambiguation)
 Colombia (disambiguation)
 Colombian (disambiguation)
 Colombiana (disambiguation)
 Colombine (disambiguation)
 Colombina (disambiguation)